Mileta Jakšić (Serbian Cyrillic: Милета Јакшић; 29 March 1863 – 8 November 1935) was a Serbian poet. He had a great love of nature which is reflected in all his works.

Biography
Mileta Jakšić was born on 29 March 1863 in Srpska Crnja in Banat. He was the nephew of one of the best-known Serbian poets of the 19th century, Djura Jakšić (1832-1878). He was the son of Jovan and Emilija Jakšić; his grandfather Dionisije and his father Jovan were parish priests of Srpska Crnja. At the age of seven Mileta's mother died. In 1879 Jakšić went to Novi Sad, where he was enabled to attend gymnasium. After an interval of private study in Osijek he went in 1889 to the Theological College in Sremski Karlovci and in 1893 he went to Vienna, where he fell under the influence of Vatroslav Jagić and Jakob Minor and others. On the completion of his university course in philology he returned home, was for three years rector of the Serbian Orthodox Seminary of Hopovo where he taught Serbian language, history and homiletics. From 1891 to 1899 he worked in Temisvar before returning to Srpska Crnja where he took over his father's parish until 1920. At the age of fifty he renounced the priesthood, and married Zorka Andrejević, a teacher from a nearby village of Klarija. They had a daughter, Emilija, who died in a car accident in 1949. 
 
During World War I he collected funds for the Red Cross societies of Serbia and Montenegro and when the Axis occupied Serbia Jakšić was imprisoned for 15 days. After leaving Srpska Crnja and priesthood, he became chief librarian of Matica Srpska at Belgrade. Mileta Jakšić died there on 8 November 1935, and was buried in Novo groblje.

Poetry
Mileta Jakšić's first poems appeared in the literary review called Javor in 1891. In them we sense a strong influence of Vojislav Ilić with whom he shared a mutual friendship and literary sympathies with Pushkin and Vasily Zhukovsky. His own relationship to the Vojislavist movement, which is itself continuously recruiting new founding fathers (or grandfathers as in Vojislav Ilić's tracing of the movement to Pushkin) and claiming an almost meaninglessly wide circle of progeny. The most fundamental question raised by these poets is, to be sure, Nature itself.
 
He followed — Vojislavism — of the time, though not the only one. Among the best known Serbian poets who looked up to Vojislav Ilić's genius, during that period were Milorad Mitrović (poet), Aleksa Šantić, Danica Marković, and for a short while even Jovan Dučić who soon went on to abandon "Vojislavism" and start his own movement with Milan Rakić. Mileta Jakšić has written a large number of poems, some of which have appeared in volume form. He was the first to part company with Vojislavism and his Pesme (Poems), published in Velika Kikinda in 1899 (in volume form), demonstrates an original poet in the making. He started as a follower of Vojislav Ilić, but soon freed himself from all the "influences", to find his own original tone. He's a rare and sincere poet of his period: he writes what he sees around him and what he feels within himself.
 
Mileta Jakšić also wrote prose, his best work is "Mysteries". When poet Veljko Petrović (poet) started writing stories Mileta Jakšić withdrew, though his prose work was considered of high literary value. Both Veljko Petrović and Mileta Jakŝić are considered the best poets of old Vojvodina in their day.
 
Any Serbian poet who is playing a high game — as poet and worshipper — in the presence of nature, must surely feel himself to be standing in the shadow of Vojislav Ilić and Pushkin, or in their light. According to critic Jovan Skerlić, Mileta Jakšić was able to acknowledge the romantic poets and the nature poets. "For he follows a path that was plowed before him by Jovan Subotić and Jovan Grčić-Milenko."

Works
 Pesme, Beograd 1922. 
 Dečija zbirka pesama i proze, Novi Sad 1929. 
 Sunčanica, Beograd 1929. 
 Legende i priče za decu i odrasle, Beograd 1931. 
 Mirna vremena, Beograd 1935. 
 Deoba vrlika, Novi Sad 
 Sveti apostol Pavle, život mu i rad, Novi Sad 
 Velika tišina
 Nečista kuća
 Roman usamljenog mladića
 Urok

As editor
 Dečija zbirka, J. J. Zmaja (Novi Sad 1929) 
 Dečija zbirka pesama, Vojislava Ilića (Novi Sad 1929)
 
Magazines and Periodicals
 Neven (1884-1887) 
 Javor (1891-1893) 
 Stražilovo (1892-1894) 
 Otadžbina (1892) 
 Bosanska vila (1892-1895, 1910-1911, 1914) 
 Delo (1894) 
 Ženski svet (1894) 
 Brankovo kolo (1895-1899, 1903, 1906-1909, 1914)

References

Sources
 

1863 births
1935 deaths
20th-century Serbian people
19th-century Serbian poets
People from Nova Crnja
Serbian male poets
19th-century male writers
Burials at Belgrade New Cemetery